The Turk Site (15CE6) is a Mississippian culture archaeological site located near Bardwell in Carlisle County, Kentucky, on a bluff spur overlooking the Mississippi River floodplain.

Site
The  site was occupied primarily during the Dorena Phase (1100 to 1300 CE) and into the Medley Phase (1300-1500 CE) of the local chronology. Its inhabitants may have moved from the Marshall Site, which is a slightly older settlement located on the nearest adjacent bluff spur. 

For a regional administrative center, Turk is a small site, but this is because of constraints placed on it by the geography of the bluff spur it sits on. The layout of the site is characteristically Mississippian, with a number of platform mounds surrounding a central plaza.

The earliest published investigation at the site was that of Robert Loughridge, published in 1888; the most extensive work at the site was conducted under Richard Edging and published in 1985.

See also
 National Register of Historic Places listings in Carlisle County, Kentucky
 Mississippian stone statuary
 Southeastern Ceremonial Complex
 List of Mississippian sites

References

External links
 Early shell tempering in far Western Kentucky

Middle Mississippian culture
Mounds in Kentucky
Archaeological sites on the National Register of Historic Places in Kentucky
Geography of Carlisle County, Kentucky
National Register of Historic Places in Carlisle County, Kentucky